Lac de Chalain is a lake in the Jura department of France. It is located on the territory of the commune of Fontenu.

Chalain